Tom Howe (born 26 December 1977) is a British composer and musician who has worked on over 100 films and television series. Growing up in a musical family, Tom was classically trained on piano, clarinet and guitar.

After attending the University of Edinburgh, he became a session musician in both classical and contemporary spheres, working with multiple bands, including Adult Jazz, and performed at multiple live events, including David Byrne's Meltdown Festival.

He started writing for TV in 2008, with music credits for the BBC production How The Celts Saved Britain presented by Dan Snow. In 2011 he co-wrote with Gary Go on the theatrical release Love's Kitchen.

He developed a close working relationship with established composers Harry and Rupert Gregson-Williams and subsequently has worked on multiple major TV series and movies, including Wonder Woman, Mulan, A Shaun the Sheep Movie: Farmageddon and Ted Lasso.

Other work includes music for The Great British Bake Off, Taskmaster, Whiskey Cavalier, Paranormal Witness, and The Lodge.

Following his work with Bill Lawrence on Whiskey Cavalier he was asked to work on the new Apple Series Ted Lasso with Marcus Mumford

In June 2020, Howe was made a member of the Academy of Motion Picture Arts and Sciences.

Film

Television Credits

Awards and nominations 
In 2018, Howe was nominated for Best Score for a Feature Film at the Film Music Festival Jerry Goldsmith Awards for his work on Professor Marston and the Wonder Women.

In 2019, he received a nomination at the 46th Annie Awards from ASIFA for Outstanding Achievement for Music in an Animated Feature Production, for Early Man, shared with Harry Gregson-Williams.

He received two nominations at the 2020 Hollywood Music In Media Awards: one for Outstanding Score — Animated Film for his work on A Shaun the Sheep Movie: Farmageddon and one for Original Score — TV Show/Limited Series for Ted Lasso.

In 2020, Howe was awarded the 2020 ASCAP Screen Music Award for Top Television Series, for his work on Whiskey Cavalier, and also the Discovery of the Year at the World Soundtrack Awards at Film Fest Ghent for his work on A Shaun the Sheep Movie: Farmageddon.

In 2021 Howe received an Emmy nomination for Outstanding Original Main Title Theme Music  and a 2021 Hollywood Music In Media Awards (HMMA) nomination for Score - TV Show/Limited Series with Marcus Mumford.

References 

1977 births
Animation composers
British film score composers
British male film score composers
Aardman Animations people
British television composers
Living people
Male television composers